SV Morlautern is a German association football club from the Morlautern suburb of the city of Kaiserslautern, Rhineland-Palatinate. The club's greatest success has been promotion to the tier five Oberliga Rheinland-Pfalz/Saar in 2016.

History
The club dates back to 15 July 1912 when the football club SpVgg Morlautern was formed. In the following years two more football clubs were formed in Morlautern, FV-Germania and FC Bayern, the Palatinate being part of the Kingdom of Bavaria at the time, and the three clubs merged to form the current SV Morlautern 1912 on 9 September 1919.

SV Morlautern played in local amateur football league for most of its history. The club became the last station in the career of Werner Kohlmeyer, former 1. FC Kaiserslautern player and member of the West German 1954 FIFA World Cup winning team. The club organised a two-yearly youth tournament in the latters name after Kohlmeyer's early death, the Werner-Kohlmeyer-Memorial-Tournament.

The club began to rise through the league system from 2009 onwards. Four championships and promotions took the club from the tier ten Kreisliga to the tier six Verbandsliga Südwest from 2010 to 2013. After finishing fourth and third in the Verbandsliga in 2014 and 2015 the club came second in 2015–16 and, after two wins in the promotion round, moved up to the Oberliga Rheinland-Pfalz/Saar for the first time.

Honours
The club's honours:
 Landesliga Südwest West
 Champions:2012–13
 Bezirksliga Westpfalz
 Champions: 2011–12
 Bezirksklasse Westpfalz Nord
 Champions: 2010–11
 Kreisliga Kaiserslautern
 Champions: 2003–04, 2009–10
 Southwestern Cup
 Winners: 2017

Recent seasons 
The recent season-by-season performance of the club:

 With the introduction of the 3. Liga in 2008 as the new third tier, below the 2. Bundesliga, all leagues below dropped one tier.

References

External links 
Official club site 
SV Morlautern at fupa.net 

Football clubs in Germany
Football clubs in Rhineland-Palatinate
Association football clubs established in 1912
1912 establishments in Germany
Kaiserslautern